Ernst W. Kalinke (1918–1992) was a German cinematographer. He shot over a hundred films during his career and also directed one, the 1982 comedy Die liebestollen Lederhosen

Selected filmography

 Encounter with Werther (1949)
 The Lady in Black (1951)
 The Last Shot (1951)
 The Postponed Wedding Night (1953)
 Aunt Jutta from Calcutta (1953)
 The Immortal Vagabond (1953)
 The Village Under the Sky (1953)
 Victoria and Her Hussar (1954)
 The Sun of St. Moritz (1954)
 Hello, My Name Is Cox (1955)
 As Long as There Are Pretty Girls (1955)
 The Mistress of Solderhof (1955)
 The Beggar Student (1956)
 Aunt Wanda from Uganda (1957)
 The Green Devils of Monte Cassino (1958)
 U 47 – Kapitänleutnant Prien (1958)
 A Song Goes Round the World (1958)
 Der Frosch mit der Maske (1959)
 Bombs on Monte Carlo (1960)
 We Will Never Part (1960)
 Treasure of the Silver Lake (1962)
 The Strangler of Blackmoor Castle (1963)
 Apache Gold (1963)
 Room 13 (1964)
 Last of the Renegades (1964)
 The Sinister Monk (1965)
 The Desperado Trail (1965)
 The Last Tomahawk (1965)
 Die Nibelungen (1966)
 Creature with the Blue Hand (1967)
 Seven Days Grace (1969)
 Mark of the Devil (1970)
 The Sex Nest (1970)
 The Bordello (1971)
 Hubertus Castle (1973)
 Mark of the Devil Part II (1973)
 The Hunter of Fall (1974)
 Silence in the Forest (1976)
 Waldrausch (1977)
 Lady Dracula (1977)
 Inn of the Sinful Daughters (1978)
 Goetz von Berlichingen of the Iron Hand (1979)
 Three Lederhosen in St. Tropez (1980)
 Der Bockerer (1981)

References

Bibliography 
 Bergfelder, Tim. International Adventures: German Popular Cinema and European Co-Productions in the 1960s. Berghahn Books, 2005.

External links 
 

1918 births
1992 deaths
Film people from Berlin
German cinematographers